"Open Up Your Heart (And Let the Sunshine In)" (sometimes seen as "And Let the Sun Shine In") is a popular song written by Stuart Hamblen and first published in 1954.

The original version was by the Cowboy Church Sunday School and was a hit in the United States, peaking at number 8 on the Billboard charts. Another widely known US recording was released shortly after by the McGuire Sisters, and the United Kingdom saw a version by Joan Regan and her son Rusty.

When the Cowboy Church Sunday School version is played at normal speed, the vocals sound unnaturally high.  When played at 33⅓ rpm instead of 45 rpm the vocals sound more natural. The song was recorded at that speed, by Stuart Hamblen's wife and adult daughter, so that when played at 45 rpm the song sounds as if it is being sung by children.

The version sung by the Cowboy Church Sunday School was featured twice in the John Waters film A Dirty Shame. The song was first used as an angelic juxtaposition to the intolerant concept of NIMBY. It was later used satirically in a scene depicting the religious aspects of 12-step programs. The version sung by the McGuire Sisters was featured in the André Øvredal horror film The Autopsy of Jane Doe.

The melody of the chorus section is identical for its first two measures to the published version of "Aloha Oe" by Princess Lili`uokalani (1878), and "There's Music in the Air" by George F. Root (1854), and all three share the same chord progression IV-I-V-I.

The 1969 number 1 hit song "Aquarius/Let the Sunshine In" by The 5th Dimension contains the refrain "Let the Sunshine In" and backing vocals that include the phrase "Open Up Your Heart".

Covers
The most famous recording of this song featured Pebbles and Bamm-Bamm on The Flintstones "No Biz Like Show Biz" episode (which originally aired September 17, 1965). The clip of them performing this song was sometimes played during the closing credits in the show's final season (1965–1966), this episode being the opener of that season. Although Pebbles and Bamm Bamm went on to form a rock band as teenagers in the 1970s, they never approached the classic heights of their early childhood tune. The Flintstones version of the song was not stripped of its religious lyrics for inclusion in the show.  The only change to the lyrics was the substitution of "little kid" for "little girl". Original vocals were provided by Rebecca Page (as Pebbles) and her mother Ricky Page (as Bamm Bamm), who later became "The Bermudas" and then "The Majorettes". They were managed by George Motola, who was Ricky's husband.
Anne Murray included the song (in a medley with "You Are My Sunshine") on her 1977 album There's a Hippo in My Tub.
Frente! recorded a cover of the song for inclusion on the 1995 tribute album Saturday Morning: Cartoons’ Greatest Hits, produced by Ralph Sall for MCA Records, in tribute to the Flintstones version.

References

Songs written by Stuart Hamblen
1954 songs
Christian songs
The Flintstones